United Airlines Flight 389 was a scheduled flight from LaGuardia Airport, New York City, New York, to O'Hare International Airport, Chicago, Illinois. There was no indication of any unusual problem prior to impact.

A definitive cause was not determined by National Transportation Safety Board (NTSB) investigators. However, it was believed that the crash was most likely the result of the pilots misreading their three-pointer (3p) altimeters by 10,000 feet.

At the time of the accident, United Airlines had 39 other 727s in its fleet (of the 247 Boeing 727s ordered), all of which were 727-100 (727-22).

The accident was both the first hull-loss and first fatal accident of a Boeing 727.

Aircraft

The aircraft involved was a United Airlines Boeing 727-100 (727-22), registration  With serial number 18328, and line number 146, the aircraft had its maiden flight on May 18, 1965 with delivery to United Airlines on June 3, 1965 meaning it had been in passenger service for two and a half months before it crashed. The aircraft had completed 138 cycles (take offs and landings) before the accident, was equipped with three Pratt & Whitney JT8D-1 engines for propulsion and had no major mechanical problems reported in the time leading up to the accident.

Before the crash Boeing 727s had been operating commercially for approximately two years and N7036U was the first 727 to be written off. It was also one of two United Airlines 727s to crash that year, the other later that year being United Airlines Flight 227, a fatal crash landing attributed to poor decision made by the captain.

Accident sequence
Instead, it continued its descent, at an uninterrupted rate of approximately 2,000 feet per minute, until it hit the waters of Lake Michigan, which is  MSL.

The control tower at O'Hare lost radio contact with the plane as it approached the western shore of Lake Michigan. A tower crewman at O'Hare said the pilot had just received landing instructions and had replied "Roger" when communication with the plane failed. Wallace Whigam, a lifeguard for the Chicago Park District, reported from the North Avenue Beach House that he had seen an orange flash on the horizon. Three seconds later, he reported, there was a "thundering roar." Other reports of the crash flooded police and Coast Guard from the North Side and North Shore.

The Coast Guard reported that skin divers had assembled at the North Shore Yacht Club in Highland Park, which was used as an informal search base. After a search of several hours there were no signs of survivors, though the area was kept ready in case any were found. Hours after the crash, members of the Civil Aeronautics Board (the predecessor to the NTSB) were on scene to begin investigating the accident.

The most likely explanation is the pilots thought they were descending through  MSL when they were actually descending through only 6,000 feet MSL. Time and radar-image analyses indicated the plane was already down to an altitude of between  MSL when it was again given the  clearance limit. That final clearance was acknowledged by the captain, and was the last communication with ATC prior to impact with the water.

The night visibility was "fuzzy and unclear", and lights on the shoreline were the only ones visible.

Altimeter study

A study by the Naval Research Laboratory published in January 1965 found that, of four different designs of pilot altimeters, the three-pointer design was the one most prone to misreading by pilots. The study revealed that the three-pointer design was misread almost eight times more often than the best-designed of the four altimeters tested. It was also noted that it took the pilots considerably longer to decipher the correct reading of the three-pointer than with the other altimeters.

Investigation
The NTSB estimated the plane was traveling at a speed of approximately  when it impacted the water. The FDR casing was recovered, but the device internals including recording media was never found.

Probable cause

The second proven case was the 1958 Bristol Britannia 312 crash near Christchurch, Dorset, in the south of England, on December 24, 1958. While the former carried only a flight crew, all seven passengers and two of the crew members perished in the latter accident, and surviving crew members helped to pinpoint the cause.

See also
 Iberia Airlines Flight 062 - another incident where altimeter misreading is suspected, but not proven
 1958 BOAC Bristol Britannia crash
 Air safety
 List of unrecovered flight recorders

References

External links

 Final accident report - National Transportation Safety Board (Alternate)
Figure 1
 Figure 2

Aviation accidents and incidents in the United States in 1965
1965 in Illinois
Airliner accidents and incidents in Illinois
History of Chicago
Airliner accidents and incidents involving controlled flight into terrain
Accidents and incidents involving the Boeing 727
389
United Airlines flight 389 crash
August 1965 events in the United States